Dong Guojian (born March 16, 1987, in Luquan County, Yunnan province) is a Chinese 2012 Olympics athlete who competes in the Marathon.

Dong was born into a family of farmers in Jiaopingdu Township 皎平渡镇 in the hills of rural Luquan County, Yunnan, where the elevation is about 2,300 metres above sea level.

In 2016, Dong Guojian ran at the Chongqing International Marathon with a personal best of 2:11:41. Dong currently holds the Chinese half marathon record with a time of 1:02:51 in 2009.

He finished seventh in the Berlin Marathon 2019 at 02:08:28.

See also 
China at the 2012 Summer Olympics – Athletics
Athletics at the 2012 Summer Olympics – Men's marathon

References

External links 
 
 
 
 
 

1987 births
Living people
Chinese male long-distance runners
Athletes (track and field) at the 2012 Summer Olympics
Olympic athletes of China
Sportspeople from Kunming
Athletes (track and field) at the 2010 Asian Games
Athletes (track and field) at the 2018 Asian Games
Asian Games competitors for China
Runners from Yunnan
People from Luquan Yi and Miao Autonomous County
Athletes (track and field) at the 2020 Summer Olympics
20th-century Chinese people
21st-century Chinese people